Luohu station (Cantonese Jyutping: Lo4 Wu4 Zaam6) is an underground terminus of Line 1 of the Shenzhen Metro in Shenzhen, Guangdong Province, China. It is located beneath the East Plaza of Shenzhen railway station in Shenzhen's Luohu District. It is the second-busiest station in the network in terms of system entries and exits, with approximately 56,400 passengers a day.

Opened on 28 December 2004, Luohu station offers interchange to the Guangzhou–Shenzhen railway at Shenzhen railway station, and to the Hong Kong MTR at Lo Wu station. Two tracks run through the station, with platforms on either side; passengers board from the central island platform and alight on the side platforms. This configuration is known as the Spanish solution.

Station layout

Exits

See also
 Guangzhou–Shenzhen railway
 Shenzhen railway station (China Railway including CRH)
 Lo Wu station (Hong Kong MTR)

References

External links

 Shenzhen Metro Luohu Station (Chinese)
 Shenzhen Metro Luohu Station (English)

Railway stations in Guangdong
Shenzhen Metro stations
Luohu District
Railway stations in China opened in 2004
Railway stations located underground in China